This is the production discography of hip-hop artist Necro, spanning over 18 years.

Al Tariq
 2000: The Artist Formerly Known As Fashion ("Feel This Shit", "Black Nasty Muthafucka")

Cage
 1992: "Just Like Clockwork"
 1997: "Radiohead"
 1997: "Agent Orange"
 2002: Movies for the Blind ("Agent Orange" - slightly edited)

Captain Carnage
 1994: "Destined To Die"
 2005: "Freestyle"

The Circle of Tyrants (Necro, Ill Bill, Goretex, Mr. Hyde)
 2005: The Circle of Tyrants (all tracks)

Exlib
 2001: Pandora's Box ("Feed Your Head")

Goretex
 1995: "Gettin Dusted"
 2004: The Art of Dying (all tracks)
 2004: The Art of Dying Instrumentals

Ill Bill
 2003: Howie Made Me Do It ("Gangsta Rap", "How to Kill a Cop")
 2004: What's Wrong with Bill? (all tracks)
 2004: What's Wrong with Bill? Instrumentals
 2005: Psycho+Logical/Uncle Howie Records 2005 Sampler ("The Revolution Will Be Classified", "Paradise Ranch" - unfinished Secret Society tracks)
 2006: Ill Bill Is The Future 2: I'm A Goon ("Focus On Bill")
 2008: The Hour of Reprisal ("The Unauthorized Biography of Slayer", "The Most Dangerous Weapon Alive")

Injustice
 1990: "Necrosphere", "Wisdom Of The Subgenius", "Ascend To Obscurity"

Mark "Chopper" Read
 2006: Interview with a Madman ("Do It")

Missin' Linx
 1998: "Locked Down"
 2000: Exhibit A ("What it Is")

Mr. Hyde
 1998: "Verbal Slugs"
 2004: "Demonic Harmonix"
 2004: Barn of the Naked Dead (all tracks)
 2004: Barn of the Naked Dead Instrumentals
 2008: Chronicles of the Beast Man ("Braaains", "Street Veteran pt. 3")

Mr. Muthafuckin' eXquire
 2011: Lost In Translation ("Huzzah!", "The Last Huzzah! (Remix)")

Necro
 1992: "Fresh Death", "Wreck The Rectum"
 1993: "One for the Butcherknife", "Do The Charles Manson"
 1994: "Blunt On The Topic Of The Stunt", "Garbage Bag", "Sex With Female Rednecks", "Butcher Knife", "Raped Infants", "Eat Shit And Die", "Butcher Knife Gat", "Snails In Your Entrails", "Guilty Til Proven Innocent", "What Ya Gonna Do"
 1995: "Robbery", "Dedicated To The Trife"

 1990: Inhuman Conditions (All Tracks)
 1997: Get On Your Knees / Underground (All Tracks)
 1998: Cockroaches EP (All Tracks)
 1999: The Most Sadistic / You're Dead (All Tracks)
 1999: Your F****** Head Split / Rugged S*** (All Tracks)
 2000: I Need Drugs (All Tracks)
 2000: I Need Drugs (Single) (All Tracks)
 2001: Bury You With Satan / World Gone Mad (All Tracks)
 2001: Gory Days (All Tracks)
 2001: Gory Days (Instrumentals) (All Tracks)
 2001: Instrumentals, Vol. 1 (Remastered) (All Tracks)
 2003: Brutality Part 1) (All Tracks)
 2004: The Pre-Fix For Death (All Tracks)
 2005: Brutality Part 1 (Instrumentals) (All Tracks)
 2005: The Circle Of Tyrants (All Tracks)
 2005: The Sexorcist (All Tracks)
 2005: Who's Ya Daddy? / P**** Is My Weakness (All Tracks)
 2007: Death Rap) (All Tracks)
 2007: Death Rap (Instrumentals) (All Tracks)
 2010: Die! (All Tracks)
 2010: Die! (Insertdamentalz) (All Tracks)

Non Phixion
 1995: "Revolutionize", "War Is Everywhere", "Spaces Around Me",
 1996: "No Tomorrow"
 1997: "5 Boros"
 1998: "I Shot Reagan", "Refuse To Lose"
 2002: The Future Is Now ("Futurama", "The C.I.A. Is Trying To Kill Me", "There Is No Future", "Say Goodbye To Yesterday", "Black Helicopters", "Strange Universe", "The C.I.A. Is Still Trying To Kill Me")
 2003: "Say Goodbye To Yesterday (Remix)" (from Biker Boyz Soundtrack)
 2004: "This Is Not An Exercise"
 2004: The Green CD/DVD ("The Freshfest", "Criminal", "Refuse to Lose")
 2005: "The Plague" (from the never-released album Nuclear Truth - left unfinished after Non Phixion disbanded)

Q-Unique
 2004: Vengeance Is Mine ("The Set Up", "The Ugly Place", "Canarsie Artie's Revenge", "Father's Day", "Psychological Warfare")
 2010: Between Heaven & Hell ("Between Heaven & Hell Prologue")

Raekwon
 2009: Only Built 4 Cuban Linx II ("Gihad")

Riviera Regime
 2008: Real Soldierz Ride ("Golani Brigade")

Sabac Red
 2004: Sabacolypse: A Change Gon' Come (All Tracks)
 2004: Sabacolypse: A Change Gon' Come Instrumentals

Troy Dunnit
 2003: Rugged Radio Saturday ("Not Gangsta")

References 

Production discographies
Hip hop discographies